Uninsky District is an administrative and municipal district (raion), one of the thirty-nine in Kirov Oblast, Russia. It is located in the southeast of the oblast. Its administrative center is the urban locality (an urban-type settlement) of Uni. Population:  11,179 (2002 Census);  The population of Uni accounts for 50.0% of the district's total population.

References

Notes

Sources

Districts of Kirov Oblast